Paul Norman may refer to:

 Paul Norman (game designer) (born 1951), American video game designer
 Paul Norman (scientist) (1951–2004), British scientist
 Paul Norman (director) (born 1956), American pornographic film director